Manfred Wachter (born 25 September 1969) is an Austrian football manager and former Austrian footballer who played as a midfielder.

External links
 

1969 births
Living people
Austrian footballers
2. Liga (Austria) players
First Vienna FC players
SKN St. Pölten players
SV Würmla players
Association football midfielders